Old Montagnais is the period in the history of the Innu-aimun language preceding its current form.

There are several sound changes that Old Montagnais underwent. One example is the change from Old Montagnais ayaškimew to modern Innu ayassimēw.

References

Innu culture
Indigenous languages of the North American eastern woodlands
Central Algonquian languages
First Nations languages in Canada